SBTC may refer to:

 San Bernardino Transit Center
 Small Business in Transportation Coalition
 Skill-biased technological change
 Southern Baptists of Texas Convention, a state convention of the Southern Baptist Convention which broke away from the larger Baptist General Convention of Texas during the "conservative-moderate" issues of the 1980-1990 timeframe- 
 St. Benedict Technology Symposium is a non-profit organization that provide other non-profits with technical support. They operate in the Chicago area. 
 S.B.T.C, the initials at end of the Kidnapping of JonBenét Ramsey ransom note.
 Una-Comandatuba Airport